The 2020 Nova Scotia Scotties Tournament of Hearts, the provincial women's curling championship of Nova Scotia, was held from January 20 to 26 at the Dartmouth Curling Club in Dartmouth. The winning Mary-Anne Arsenault rink represented Nova Scotia at the 2020 Scotties Tournament of Hearts in Moose Jaw, Saskatchewan and finished with a 4–4 record. The event was held in conjunction with the 2020 Deloitte Tankard, the provincial men's curling championship.

Mary-Anne Arsenault defeated former teammate Colleen Jones 7–4 in the final to win her ninth Nova Scotia Scotties Tournament of Hearts.

Qualification process

Teams
The teams are listed as follows:

Notes
  Colleen Pinkey is skipping Team Mattatall as Mary Mattatall is coaching the Taylour Stevens rink at the 2020 Canadian Junior Curling Championships.

Round-robin standings
Final round-robin standings

Round-robin results
All draw times are listed in Atlantic Standard Time (UTC-04:00).

Draw 1
Monday, January 20, 8:00 pm

Draw 2
Tuesday, January 21, 2:00 pm

Draw 3
Wednesday, January 22, 9:00 am

Draw 4
Wednesday, January 22, 7:00 pm

Draw 5
Thursday, January 23, 2:00 pm

Draw 6
Friday, January 24, 9:00 am

Draw 7
Friday, January 24, 7:00 pm

Tiebreaker
Saturday, January 25, 9:00 am

Playoffs

Semifinal
Saturday, January 25, 7:00 pm

Final
Sunday, January 26, 2:30 pm

Qualification

Qualifier
December 13–15, Berwick Curling Club, Berwick

References

External links

Nova Scotia
Curling competitions in Halifax, Nova Scotia
Sport in Dartmouth, Nova Scotia
2020 in Nova Scotia
January 2020 sports events in Canada